Vasiliev Nini (born 1954 in Gjirokastra, Albania) is an Albanian-born American sculptor who lives in Columbus, Ohio.

In 1979, he graduated with distinction from the Academy of Arts, Branch of Monumental Sculpture, in Tirana, Albania.

Since 2 July 2007, he has lived in United States.

He sculpts in a variety of materials such as marble, granite, stone, wood, bronze, metal and chrome but is not limited according to his visions and variably to different textures, medias and colors. As a teacher he spread knowledge and experience at the Center for the Implementation of Art Works and lectured at the Academy of Fine Arts-Branch of Figurative Arts in Tirana; also continued to organize private fine art classes in Omaha, Nebraska.

Early life

His sculpting expanded through projects for the Ministry of Education, the Albanian League of Writers and Artists, and with the following commissions:

 1982 triptych of monumental sculpture, Museum Erseka, Albania (bronze, 9m x 3m x 70 cm)
 1984 monument of Helmes, Skrapar, co-author Albania (artificial stone, 8m x 1.20 cm x 1,20 cm)
 1985 monument Kordelja (Ribbon) dedicated to the Women's Institute, co-author, Tirana, Albania (bronze & artificial stone, 4m x 2.50 cm x 2.50 cm)
 1986 A Woman Singer, a park sculpture, Tirana, Albania (bronze, 2m x 1m x 1m)
 1988 A Woman Swimmer, a park sculpture, National Park Sports Center, Tirana, Albania (bronze, 2.50 cm x 70 cm x 50 cm)
 1992 memorial dedicated to the martyrs of Palokaster Village, Gjirokastra, Albania (artificial stone, 3.50 x 1m x 1m)
 1999 monument of Jakov Xoxe, Fier, Albania (granite and bronze, 3m x 50 cm x 50 cm)

Exhibitions 

 2003 Louisville Art Gallery, Louisville, Nebraska
 2004 Bellevue University, Bellevue, Nebraska
 2004 Hot Shop Festival of Art, Omaha, Nebraska 
 2004 Open House Artists Impressions, Ralston, Nebraska
 2004 Louisville Art Gallery, Louisville, Nebraska 
 2004 Hot Shop Art Center Open House, May and December, Omaha, Nebraska
 2004 Hot Shop Art Center-Barker Studio Project Omaha, Nebraska
 2005 Collective Exhibition Hot Shop Art Center, Tsunami Relief, Omaha, Nebraska
 2005 Exhibition, Embassy of Albania, Washington, D.C.
 2007 Exhibition in Armory Center, Zanesville, Ohio
 2009 Exhibition at Ohio University, Zanesville, Ohio

See also 

 List of Albanians
 List of people from Columbus, Ohio
 Modern Albanian art

Bibliography
 1996 "Onufri '96" Exhibition in National Art Gallery, Tirana, Albania 
 1986 First place in National Competition for Park sculpture in Tirana, Albania
 1981, 1983, 1985 Prices for sculpture at National Art Gallery in Tirana, Albania

References 

shortnorth.com

whiznews.com
news in U.S.A
illyriapress.com

External links

askart.com
artwanted.com
michaelmurphymusic.com

1954 births
20th-century Albanian sculptors
20th-century American sculptors
21st-century Albanian sculptors
21st-century American sculptors
Albanian emigrants to the United States
Albanian sculptors
Living people
Artists from Columbus, Ohio
People from Gjirokastër
Sculptors from Ohio